Quakertown Airport  is a public airport in Bucks County, Pennsylvania, owned by the Bucks County Airport Authority. It is two miles west of Quakertown, Pennsylvania and was dedicated on 22 January 1965. It is home to the Civil Air Patrol Squadron 904.

Facilities
Its one runway, 11/29, is 3,201 by 50 feet (976 x 15 m) asphalt.

In the year ending 4 September 2008 the airport had 29,642 aircraft operations, average 81 per day: 99% general aviation and 1% air taxi. 88 aircraft were then based at the airport: 89% single-engine, 6% multi-engine, 2% jet, 1% helicopter and 2% ultralight.

References

External links
 Quakertown Airport at Bucks County Airport Authority website
 Civil Air Patrol Squadron 904
 Aerial photo as of 13 April 1999 from USGS The National Map via MSR Maps
 Quakertown Airport (UKT) at PennDOT Bureau of Aviation
 

Airports in Pennsylvania
County airports in Pennsylvania
Transportation buildings and structures in Bucks County, Pennsylvania
1965 establishments in Pennsylvania